Javier Morales (born 10 January 1980) is an Argentine former footballer who played as a midfielder. He currently serves as an academy coach at Inter Miami CF.

Career

Argentina
From 1998 to 2006, Morales played for four different clubs in the Argentine Primera División, including two stints each with Lanús and Arsenal de Sarandí.  He spent most of that time with Avellaneda-based Arsenal, playing in 146 matches and scoring 15 goals for the club.  He spent his last season in Argentina with Instituto before moving to Spain.

Spain
Morales spent 2006-07 with UD Vecindario of the Spanish Second Division LIGA BBVA.  In one lone season with the club, he scored five goals in 23 matches (20 starts).

United States
In August 2007, Morales moved to the United States to play for Real Salt Lake of Major League Soccer. Morales was acquired by Real Salt Lake at the same time as fellow Argentines Matias Mantilla and Fabián Espíndola.  Morales made an immediate impact for RSL—he tallied an assist 40 seconds into his MLS debut (August 29 vs. the Kansas City Wizards) - the fastest first assist in MLS history. His first career goal for RSL came September 19 against the Los Angeles Galaxy.  He finished the season with one goal and two assists in seven matches (five starts).

In his second season with RSL (2008), Morales emerged as a star player and team leader. He started 29 of Real Salt Lake's 30 contests, totaling 6 goals (tied with Robbie Findley for second-highest on the team, just behind Yura Movsisyan). Morales tallied 15 assists, shattering the club record of 11 set by Jeff Cunningham in 2006. It was the second-highest total in the MLS that season, behind only league MVP Guillermo Barros Schelotto of the Columbus Crew. His outstanding play guided RSL to the club's first-ever appearance in the MLS Cup Playoffs, where Morales figured in all three of the team's postseason goals, scoring one and assisting on two as RSL advanced to the Western Conference Final.

During the offseason, Morales signed a contract extension to keep him in Salt Lake until 2012.  In 2009, he continued as one of RSL's top players, although his numbers declined somewhat. His play has been solid enough to earn him a selection in the 2009 MLS All-Star Game. Already a fan favorite, Morales scored a spectacular goal in the team's 1-0 exhibition victory over Club América on July 11. Morales started off the 2010 MLS season with a bang, tallying two goals and an assist against the San Jose Earthquakes.

On May 7, 2011, in a game against Chivas USA, Morales suffered a fracture-dislocation in his left ankle after a challenge from Marcos Mondaini. He was out for over four months, returning to play on September 28, 2011.

Morales announced that he would leave Real Salt Lake on November 3, 2016, having tallied more assists than any player in club history. He signed as a free agent with FC Dallas on December 27, 2016.

On April 12, 2018, Morales officially announced his retirement from playing professional football.

Coaching
Upon retirement, Morales became coach of the FC Dallas Under-13 academy team, guiding the team to an international championship at the Copa Rayados Internacional tournament in Mexico.

On February 19, 2019, he was named Academy Coach at Inter Miami CF.

Personal life
Morales holds a U.S. green card which qualified him as a domestic player for MLS roster purposes.

Honors

Club
Real Salt Lake
MLS Cup: 2009
Western Conference playoffs: 2013

Individual
MLS All-Star(2): 2009, 2010

References

External links
 
 Argentine League Statistics at Fútbol XXI  
 UD Vecindario webpage
 Guardian statistics

1980 births
Living people
Footballers from Buenos Aires
Argentine footballers
Argentine expatriate footballers
Club Atlético Lanús footballers
Arsenal de Sarandí footballers
Newell's Old Boys footballers
Instituto footballers
UD Vecindario players
Real Salt Lake players
FC Dallas players
Expatriate footballers in Spain
Argentine Primera División players
Expatriate soccer players in the United States
Major League Soccer All-Stars
Major League Soccer players
Designated Players (MLS)
Argentine expatriate sportspeople in Spain
Argentine expatriate sportspeople in the United States
Association football midfielders